Hister is a genus of clown beetles in the family Histeridae. There are at least 210 described species in Hister.

See also
 List of Hister species

References

Further reading

 
 
 
 
 
 
 

Histeridae